A special election was held in  on October 10, 1797 to fill a vacancy caused by the resignation of George Ege (F).

See also 
List of special elections to the United States House of Representatives

References 

Pennsylvania 1797 05
Pennsylvania 1797 05
1797 05
Pennsylvania 05
United States House of Representatives 05
United States House of Representatives 1797 05